Hu Zhiqiang (born September 1963) is a former Chinese politician who spent most of his career in northwest China's Shaanxi province. He was investigated by the Chinese Communist Party's anti-graft agency in June 2018. Previously he served as Party Branch Secretary of Shaanxi Provincial Health and Family Planning Commission. He was a delegate to the 18th National Congress of the Chinese Communist Party.

Hu is the son of Hu Fuguo, who served as party chief, governor and CPPCC Committee chairman in Shanxi province.

Early life and education
Hu was born in Danzhu Town of Zhangzi County, Shanxi in September 1963. His father Hu Fuguo (born 1937) is a retired politician who served as Chinese Communist Party Committee Secretary, governor and CPPCC Committee chairman of Shanxi in the 1990s. He has a younger brother named Hu Wenqiang. Resumption of University Entrance Examination in 1984, he was accepted to the Beijing College Finance and Commerce, majoring in industrial and commercial administration. He also studied at the Central Party School of the Chinese Communist Party and Cheung Kong Graduate School of Business as a part-time student.

Career
After graduating in September 1988 he was assigned to the State Administration for Industry and Commerce as an official. In March 1993 he was transferred to Lüliang and appointed deputy director of Huajin Coking Coal Co., Ltd, a state-owned coal mining company. He concurrently served as deputy magistrate of Mouping County between May 1994 and May 1995.

In April 1996 he was transferred back to Beijing, where he worked at Shenhua Group, a leading state-owned mining and energy company and the largest coal-producing company in China.

Depending on the relationship, Hu was transferred again to Xianyang, Shaanxi in November 2001, and served as vice-mayor and deputy party chief there.

He was deputy secretary-general of Shaanxi Provincial Government in November 2005, and held that office until February 2008.

In February 2008 he became the deputy party chief of Yulin, rising to communist party secretary in July 2011. During his tenure, he purchased offices and sold offices, making a marked price for county secretaries and county magistrates. In April 2017, he was appointed Party Branch Secretary of Shaanxi Provincial Health and Family Planning Commission, he remained in that position until June 2018, when he was placed under investigation by the Communist Party's anti-corruption agency.

Downfall
On June 12, 2018, he was put under investigation for alleged "serious violations of discipline and laws" by the Central Commission for Discipline Inspection (CCDI), the party's internal disciplinary body, and the National Supervisory Commission, the highest anti-corruption agency of China. On December 13, he was expelled from the Chinese Communist Party (CCP) and dismissed from public office. He was detained on December 24.

On February 12, 2019, he was indicted on suspicion of accepting bribes. On August 20, he stood trial at the Xi'an Intermediate People's court on charges of taking bribes. He was accused of taking advantage of the various positions he formerly held in Shaanxi to seek benefits for others certain organizations and individuals in project approval, project contracting, enterprise operation and job adjustment through himself, his wife and relatives.

References

1963 births
Living people
Central Party School of the Chinese Communist Party alumni
Cheung Kong Graduate School of Business alumni
People's Republic of China politicians from Shanxi
Chinese Communist Party politicians from Shanxi